The Yorkton Cardinals were a collegiate summer baseball team based in Yorkton, Saskatchewan, Canada, who played in the Western Canadian Baseball League. The Cardinals joined the WMBL in 2002, but there had been franchises under that name playing out of Yorkton since 1950 in various leagues. The Cardinals most notable alumni is Andrelton Simmons, shortstop for the Los Angeles Angels of Anaheim. On October 29, 2019, the WCBL granted both the Cardinals and the Melville Millionaires a one-year leave of absence. On March 25, 2021, the league announced that the Cardinals and Millionaires had left the league and ceased operations.

External links
 Yorkton Cardinals Baseball Official Homepage

Baseball teams in Saskatchewan
Sport in Yorkton